Mário Travaglini (30 April 1932 – 20 February 2014) was a Brazilian football manager and former player who played as a central defender.

Playing career
Born in Bom Retiro, São Paulo, Travaglini joined Clube Atlético Ypiranga's youth setup at the age of 16. He made his first team debut for the club on 12 September 1953, in a 1–1 Campeonato Paulista match against Corinthians at the Pacaembu Stadium.

Travaglini moved to Palmeiras in 1955, but left in the following year for Nacional-SP. He also represented Portuguesa and Ponte Preta, retiring with the latter in 1962 at the age of just 30.

Managerial career
Shortly after retiring, Travaglini worked for a brief period at the Estrada de Ferro Santos-Jundiaí before returning to football in 1963, as a manager of Palmeiras' youth categories. He remained at the club until 1971, being also in charge of first team on several occasions.

Travaglini left the São Paulo state in 1972, after being named at the helm of Vasco da Gama. He won the 1974 Série A with the club before leaving in 1975, and taking over Fluminense in 1976.

Travaglini left Flu in 1977, and was named technical supervisor of Cláudio Coutinho at the Brazil national team in the following year. In 1979, he led the under-23s to a Pan American Games gold medal.

Travaglini returned to club duties in 1980, being in charge of Operário-MS, Ferroviária and Portuguesa. He was named manager of Corinthians in 1982, being the manager of the club during the Democracia Corinthiana period, winning the 1982 Campeonato Paulista.

Travaglini was also in charge of Timão when the club defeated Tiradentes-PI by 10–1, the biggest win of Série A history. He left the club shortly after, taking over São Paulo.

In 1984, Travaglini returned to Verdão but left in the following year to return to Corinthians. He subsequently had brief periods in charge of Vitória, XV de Piracicaba, Botafogo-SP and São Bento, retiring from football in 1991.

Death
Travaglini died on 20 February 2014, due to respiratory complications coming from a brain tumor.

Honours

Manager
Palmeiras
Campeonato Paulista: 1966
Taça Brasil: 1967

Vasco da Gama
Campeonato Brasileiro Série A: 1974

Fluminense
Campeonato Carioca: 1976

Brazil U23
Pan American Games: 1979

Corinthians
Campeonato Paulista: 1982

References

1932 births
2014 deaths
Footballers from São Paulo
Brazilian footballers
Association football defenders
Sociedade Esportiva Palmeiras players
Nacional Atlético Clube (SP) players
Associação Portuguesa de Desportos players
Associação Atlética Ponte Preta players
Brazilian football managers
Campeonato Brasileiro Série A managers
Sociedade Esportiva Palmeiras managers
CR Vasco da Gama managers
Fluminense FC managers
Associação Ferroviária de Esportes managers
Associação Portuguesa de Desportos managers
Sport Club Corinthians Paulista managers
São Paulo FC managers
Esporte Clube Vitória managers
Esporte Clube XV de Novembro (Piracicaba) managers
Botafogo Futebol Clube (SP) managers
Esporte Clube São Bento managers
Deaths from brain cancer in Brazil